St. John's (Paddys Pond) Water Aerodrome  is located  southwest of St. John's, Newfoundland and Labrador, Canada on Paddy's Pond. It is open from the middle of April until October.

See also
St. John's International Airport

References

Registered aerodromes in Newfoundland and Labrador
Transport in St. John's, Newfoundland and Labrador
Seaplane bases in Newfoundland and Labrador